The Heavy Water War (original title  and alternative title The Saboteurs (UK)) is a six-episode war drama TV miniseries written by Petter S. Rosenlund and produced by Norwegian Broadcasting Corporation.
It is a Norwegian/Danish/British co-production directed by Per-Olav Sørensen based on the true story of the German nuclear weapon project during the Second World War and the heavy water sabotage in Norway to disrupt it, with a particular emphasis on the role of the Norwegian intelligence officer Leif Tronstad.

The first two episodes were initially broadcast on NRK1, on 4 January 2015. The opening episodes had 1,259,000 viewers, which was a record for the opening of a drama series in Norway.
In Denmark, the initial broadcast was on 4 May 2015 on TV 2 titled .
In the UK, the miniseries, retitled The Saboteurs, was aired by More4 from 19 June 2015 and had a good critical reception.
The series was released in the UK on DVD and Blu-ray on 10 August 2015. In Poland the show premiered on 15 January 2016 on  VOD to very good reviews.
Viewing rights for France were bought by Entertainment One, for Benelux by Lumière, for Spain by A Contracorriente, for Poland by Kino Swiat and for the Balkans by Stas Media.
Viewing rights for the US were bought by MHz Networks, which announced a DVD release date of 8 March 2016.

Production 
The series was filmed in Norway and the Czech Republic. Production costs were around 75 million Norwegian kroner, or about €7.8 million. The dialogue is in Norwegian, German, English and Danish.

Main cast 
Although the series is based on real events and persons, apart from Aubert, all other Nazi collaborating Hydro directors were purposely not mentioned by name.

 Espen Klouman Høiner as Major Leif Tronstad
 Christoph Bach as Werner Heisenberg
 Pip Torrens as Colonel John Skinner Wilson, SOE
 Anna Friel as Captain Julie Smith (fictitious)
 Søren Pilmark as Niels Bohr
 Stein Winge as Axel Aubert, Director-General of Norsk Hydro
 Dennis Storhøi as Bjørn Henriksen, plant director (fictitious)
 Maibritt Saerens as  Ellen Henriksen, plant director's wife (fictitious)
 Espen Reboli Bjerke as Jomar Brun
 David Zimmerschied as Carl Friedrich von Weizsäcker
 Andreas Döhler as Kurt Diebner, director of the German nuclear energy project
 Robert Hunger-Bühler as General der Infanterie Emil Leeb, Chief of the Waffenamt
 Corey Johnson as Major General Pat Pritchard, USAAF (fictitious)
 Peri Baumeister as Elisabeth Heisenberg

Operation "Grouse" 

 Torstein Bjørklund as Sergeant Arne Kjelstrup
 Benjamin Helstad as Second Lieutenant Jens-Anton Poulsson
 Rolf Kristian Larsen as Einar Skinnarland
 Christian Rubeck as Sergeant Claus Helberg
 Audun Sandem as Second Lieutenant Knut Haugland

Operation "Gunnerside" 

 Endre Ellefsen as Sergeant Hans Storhaug
 Ole Christoffer Ertvaag as Sergeant Birger Strømsheim
 Eirik Evjen as Second Lieutenant Kasper Idland
 Frank Kjosås as Second Lieutenant Knut Haukelid
 Mads Sjøgård Pettersen as Sergeant Fredrik Kayser
 Tobias Santelmann as Second Lieutenant Joachim Rønneberg

Episodes

Reception 
Norwegian newspaper  gave the series a 5 out of 6, citing "It will enrage some historians, and some concerned will complain, but most television viewers will be engrossed".

The series won the 2015 Prix Italia in the Series and Serials category, with the citation: "A thriller with superb acting, a high-quality production. Great cinematography, outstanding acting, excellent directing."

Viewer numbers 
The two first episodes were seen by 1.259 million in Norway, the third episode was seen by 1.239 million and the fourth by 1.288 million. The fifth episode was seen by 1.319 million while the last was seen 1.322 million. The last episode was watched by 64% of TV viewers that hour.

Historicity 
From the première there has been debate over its historical accuracy. Among concerns have been Heisenberg's involvement in the development of nuclear weapons and allusions to his homosexuality.

Previous versions

The same story was covered in the 1948 Franco-Norwegian film Kampen om tungtvannet (also known as La bataille de l'eau lourde or Operation Swallow: The Battle for Heavy Water). Quite faithful to real events, it even had many of the original Norwegian commandos starring as themselves.

The 1965 British film The Heroes of Telemark, starring Kirk Douglas and Richard Harris, was another version of the story.

Ray Mears presented a documentary called The Real Heroes of Telemark in 2003.  Despite mainly sticking to the factual evidence, some scenes in the documentary were partly dramatised, focusing on the survival skills involved in the operation.

See also 
 Norwegian heavy water sabotage

References

External links 
 
 

2010s Norwegian television series
2015 Norwegian television series debuts
2015 Norwegian television series endings
Norwegian drama television series
Television series based on actual events
Television shows set in Norway
Television shows set in Scotland
Norwegian resistance movement
NRK original programming
Science docudramas
World War II television drama series